Vivi-Anne Wassdahl (born 28 February 1932) is a Swedish alpine skier. She competed in three events at the 1956 Winter Olympics.

References

1932 births
Living people
Swedish female alpine skiers
Olympic alpine skiers of Sweden
Alpine skiers at the 1956 Winter Olympics
Sportspeople from Stockholm